Justice Montgomery may refer to:

Alexander Montgomery (Mississippi lawyer) (died 1878), associate justice of the Supreme Court of Mississippi
Malcolm B. Montgomery (1891–1974), associate justice of the Supreme Court of Mississippi
Oscar H. Montgomery (1859–1936), associate justice of the Indiana Supreme Court
Robert Morris Montgomery (1849–1920), associate justice of the Michigan Supreme Court
Seth D. Montgomery (1937–1998), associate justice of the New Mexico Supreme Court
William Watts Montgomery (1827–1897), associate justice of the Supreme Court of Georgia
Walter A. Montgomery (1845–1921), associate justice of the North Carolina Supreme Court